Ilkham Turdbyavich Batayev or Elham Battayav (born 7 November 1973) was held in extrajudicial detention in the United States Guantanamo Bay detainment camps, in Cuba.
His Guantanamo Internment Serial Number was 84. He was born in Abaye, Kazakhstan.

Batayev was captured in Afghanistan in 2001 and he was transferred to Kazakhstan on 15 December 2006.

Tom Johnson, Batayev's lawyer
On 9 August 2006 Batayev's lawyer, Tom Johnson, of Portland, Oregon, was profiled by the Willamette Week.
Johnson remarked on how Batayev continued to keep his hopes up that he would eventually be released.

Habeas corpus submissions

Elham Battayav is one of the sixteen Guantanamo captives whose amalgamated habeas corpus submissions were heard by
US District Court Judge Reggie B. Walton on 31 January 2007.

Release
The Portland, Oregon law firm Perkins Cole issued a press release on 18 December 2006 announcing Ihlkham Battayav's release.
The press release stated:

The Miami Herald reports that three of the four Kazakh detainees in Guantanamo were repatriated and set free on 21 December 2006.
According to the Herald the two other released men were Abdullah Tohtasinovich Magrupov and Yakub Abahanov.

McClatchy News Service interview
On 15 June 2008, the McClatchy News Service published a series of article based on interviews with 66 former Guantanamo captives.
Ilkham Batayev was one of the men they interviewed.
The McClatchy report stated that  Ilkham Batayev said he couldn't bring himself to talk about his Guantanamo experiences, or how he came to be in Afghanistan.

But the McClatchy report characterized previous reports  Ilkham Batayev had offered earlier—to a journalist in 2001, to his Tribunal, and to his lawyer—as inconsistent.

The McClatchy article quoted  Ilkham Batayev's lawyer, Thomas R. Johnson Jr., about the credibility of his assertion that fighters in the Uzbekistan Islamic Movement could have kidnapped him, and press-ganged him, into involuntary service in Afghanistan.  
Johnson thought that the Tribunal officers discounted this part of his story as incredible, because it was outside their experience, and they simply couldn't imagine it was credible, in Kazakhstan, Uzbekistan or Afghanistan:

References

External links
Distant Justice
Tajiks released from Guantánamo sentenced to 17 years in prison Andy Worthington
McClatchy News Service - video

Kazakhstani extrajudicial prisoners of the United States
Living people
Guantanamo detainees known to have been released
Prisoners of the Taliban
1973 births